Qavamabad (also Romanized as Qavāmābād, Qavvāmābād, and Qawwāmābād) is a village in Manzariyeh Rural District, in the Central District of Shahreza County, Isfahan Province, Iran. At the 2006 census, its population was 186, in 47 families.

References 

Populated places in Shahreza County